Sulfites or sulphites are compounds that contain the sulfite ion (or the sulfate(IV) ion, from its correct systematic name), . The sulfite ion is the conjugate base of bisulfite. Although its acid (sulfurous acid) is elusive, its salts are widely used.

Sulfites are substances that naturally occur in some foods and the human body. They are also used as regulated food additives. When in food or drink, sulfites are often lumped together with sulfur dioxide.

Structure

The structure of the sulfite anion can be described with three equivalent resonance structures. In each resonance structure, the sulfur atom is double-bonded to one oxygen atom with a formal charge of zero (neutral), and sulfur is singly bonded to the other two oxygen atoms, which each carry a formal charge of −1, together accounting for the −2 charge on the anion. There is also a non-bonded lone pair on the sulfur, so the structure predicted by VSEPR theory is trigonal pyramidal, as in ammonia (NH3). In the hybrid resonance structure, the S−O bonds are equivalently of bond order one and one-third.

Evidence from 17O NMR spectroscopic data suggests that protonation of the sulfite ion gives a mixture of isomers:

Commercial uses
Sulfites are used as a food preservative or enhancer. They may come in various forms, such as:
 Sulfur dioxide, which is not a sulfite, but a closely related chemical oxide
 Potassium bisulfite or potassium metabisulfite
 Sodium bisulfite, sodium metabisulfite or sodium sulfite

Wine
Sulfites occur naturally in all wines to some extent. Sulfites are commonly introduced to arrest fermentation at a desired time, and may also be added to wine as preservatives to prevent spoilage and oxidation at several stages of the winemaking. Sulfur dioxide (SO2) protects wine not only from oxidation, but also from bacteria.

Organic wines are not necessarily sulfite-free, but generally have lower amounts and regulations stipulate lower maximum sulfite contents for these wines. In general, white wines contain more sulfites than red wines and sweeter wines contain more sulfites than drier ones.

In the United States, wines bottled after mid-1987 must have a label stating that they contain sulfites if they contain more than 10 parts per million (ppm).
In the European Union an equivalent regulation came into force in November 2005. This includes sulfur dioxide, and the limit is on the milligrams per kilogram or per litre of sulfur dioxide equivalent. In 2012, a new regulation for organic wines came into force. In the United Kingdom, similar laws apply. Bottles of wine that contain over 10 mg/L (ppm) of "sulfites" (or sulfur dioxide) are required to bear "contains sulphites" on the label. This does not differ if sulfites are naturally occurring or added in the winemaking process.

Other foods
Sulfites are often used as preservatives in dried fruits, preserved radish, and dried potato products.

Most beers no longer contain sulfites, although some alcoholic ciders contain them. Although shrimp are sometimes treated with sulfites on fishing vessels, the chemical may not appear on the label. In 1986, the Food and Drug Administration in the United States banned the addition of sulfites to all fresh fruit and vegetables that are eaten raw.

E numbers
E numbers for sulfites as food additives are:

Health effects
Allergic reactions to sulfites appear to be very rare in the general population, but more common in hyperallergic individuals.

Sulfites are counted among the top nine food allergens, but a reaction to sulfite is not a true allergy. Some people have positive skin allergy tests to sulfites indicating true (IgE-mediated) allergy.  Chronic skin conditions in the hands, perineum, and face have been reported in individuals that regularly use cosmetics or medications containing sulfites. Occupational exposure to sulfites has been reported to cause persistent skin symptoms.

It may cause breathing difficulty within minutes after eating a food containing it. Asthmatics and possibly people with salicylate sensitivity (or aspirin sensitivity) are at an elevated risk for reaction to sulfites. Anaphylaxis and life-threatening reactions are rare. Other potential symptoms include sneezing, swelling of the throat, hives, and migraine.

A 2017 study has shown negative impacts of sulfites on bacteria found in the human microbiome.

Use and labeling regulations 
In 1986, the U.S. Food and Drug Administration banned the use of sulfites as preservatives on foods intended to be eaten fresh (such as salad ingredients). This has contributed to the increased use of erythorbic acid and its salts as preservatives.
They also cannot be added to foods high in vitamin B1 such as meats because sulfites can destroy vitamin B1 from foods

Generally, U.S. labeling regulations do not require products to indicate the presence of sulfites in foods unless it is added specifically as a preservative; still, many companies voluntarily label sulfite-containing foods. Sulfites used in food processing (but not as a preservative) are required to be listed if they are not incidental additives (21 CFR 101.100(a)(3)), and if there are more than 10 ppm in the finished product (21 CFR 101.100(a)(4))

Sulfites that are allowed to be added in food in the US are sulfur dioxide, sodium sulfite, sodium bisulfite, potassium bisulfite, sodium metabisulfite, and potassium metabisulfite.
Products likely to contain sulfites at less than 10 ppm (fruits and alcoholic beverages) do not require ingredients labels, and the presence of sulfites usually is undisclosed.

In Australia and New Zealand, sulfites must be declared in the statement of ingredients when present in packaged foods in concentrations of 10 mg/kg (ppm) or more as an ingredient; or as an ingredient of a compound ingredient; or as a food additive or component of a food additive; or as a processing aid or component of a processing aid.

Sulfites that can be added to foods in Canada are potassium bisulfite, potassium metabisulfite, sodium bisulfite, sodium dithionite, sodium metabisulfite, sodium sulfite, sulfur dioxide and sulfurous acid. These can also be declared using the common names sulfites, sulfates, sulfiting agents.

In the European Union, "EU law requires food labels to indicate “contains sulfites” (when exceeding 10 milligrams per kilogram or per litre) without specifying the amount".

Metabolic diseases
High sulfite content in the blood and urine of babies can be caused by molybdenum cofactor deficiency disease which leads to neurological damage and early death unless treated. Treatment, requiring daily injections, became available in 2009.

See also 

HSO bisulfite ion
S2O metabisulfite ion
H2SO3 sulfurous acid
SO persulfate ion
SO sulfate ion
SO hyposulfite ion
S2O thiosulfate ion
SO2 sulfur dioxide
SO3 sulfur trioxide (a sulfate precursor)
Category:Sulfites for a list of sulfites.
Grant v The Australian Knitting Mills

References 

Sulfur oxyanions
"Allergies: Sulfite Sensitivity". WebMD., 1 February 2007. What Is Sulfite Sensitivity? Foods and Ingredients To Avoid (webmd.com)